Sherwin may refer to:

Surname:
A. N. Sherwin-White (1911–1993), British historian of Ancient Rome
Adam Sherwin, journalist and a former media correspondent for The Times between 1999 and 2010
Amy Sherwin (1855–1935), the 'Tasmanian Nightingale', an Australian soprano singer
Arthur Sherwin (1879–1947), English cricketer who played first-class cricket for Derbyshire
Belle Sherwin (1869–1955), American Women's rights activist
Brent Sherwin (born 1978), Australian professional rugby league player
Brian Sherwin (born 1980), American art critic, writer, and blogger with a degree from Illinois College
Byron Sherwin, Jewish scholar and author with expertise in theology, inter-religious dialogue, mysticism and Jewish ethics
Charles Sherwin (1877–1950), English cricketer who played first-class cricket for Derbyshire
David Sherwin (born 1942), British screenwriter
Derrick Sherwin (1936–2018), British television producer, writer, and actor
Emily Sherwin, American law professor
Frank Sherwin (politician) (1905–1981), Irish independent politician
Frank Sherwin (artist), remembered for the railway posters which promoted travel to holiday destinations around Britain
Henry Sherwin (1842–1916), one of the two founders of the Sherwin-Williams Company in 1866
Howard Sherwin (1911–1997), English cricketer who played for Derbyshire in 1937
James Sherwin (born 1933), American corporate executive and International Master in chess
Jane Sherwin, British actress, known for her appearances in science fiction television
John C. Sherwin (1838–1904), U.S. Representative from Illinois
John Keyse Sherwin (1751–1790), English engraver and history-painter
Manning Sherwin (1902–1974), American composer
Martin J. Sherwin, Pulitzer Prize–winning American historian
Melvin E. Sherwin (1881–1924), founding member of FarmHouse fraternity at the University of Missouri
Mordecai Sherwin (1851–1910), professional footballer and cricketer
Ralph Sherwin (1550–1581), English Roman Catholic martyr and saint
Ralph Sherwin (actor) (1799–1830), English actor
Ralph W. Sherwin, American football coach
Robert Sherwin (born 1951), American businessman and winner of the Frances Pomeroy Naismith Award
Seán Sherwin (born 1946), Irish Fianna Fáil Party politician
Susan Sherwin (born 1947), Canadian philosopher and feminist ethicists
Thomas Sherwin (1839–1914), American Civil War general and executive
Tim Sherwin (born 1958), former professional American football tight end
William Sherwin (Australian settler) (1763–1822), Australian settler
William Sherwin (cricketer) (1839–1873), English cricketer
William Sherwin (engraver) (1645–1709), English engraver, one of the first to work with mezzotints
William Sherwin (minister) (1607–1687), English minister

Given name:

Persian has the given name Shervin.

Sherwin B. Nuland (1930–2014), American surgeon and author who taught at the Yale University School of Medicine
Sherwin Badger (1901–1972), American figure skater who competed in singles and pairs
Carolyn Sherwin Bailey (1875–1961), American children's author
Derrick Sherwin Bailey (1910–1984), Christian theologian
Sherwin Bitsui (born 1975), Native American writer
Sherwin Burickson (1934–2004), psychologist, writer, and the first Jewish editor of the Catholic Encyclopedia
Sherwin Campbell (born 1970), West Indian cricketer who played 52 Tests and 90 One Day Internationals for the West Indies
Sherwin Carlquist (born 1930), American botanist and photographer
Sherwin Cody (1868–1959), American writer and entrepreneur who developed a long-running home-study course in speaking and writing
John Sherwin Crosby (1842–1914), single tax proponent
Sherwin Ganga (born 1982), cricketer who plays for Trinidad and Tobago
Sherwin Gatchalian (born 1974), Filipino-Chinese businessman from Valenzuela City, Philippines
Sherwin Glass (1927–2005), founded Farmer's Furniture Company, the largest furniture store in the US
Ira Sherwin Hazeltine (1821–1899), Greenback Representative representing Missouri's 6th congressional district
Sherwin Peters (born 1990), Sint Maarten cricketer
Sherwin Rosen (1938–2001), American labor economist
Sherwin Stowers (born 1986), New Zealand rugby player
Sherwin Vries (born 1980), sprinter who represents South Africa after switching from Namibia in 2003
Sherwin Wine (1928–2007), rabbi and a founding figure in Humanistic Judaism

See also
Sherwin, Kansas
Frank Sherwin Bridge, road bridge spanning the River Liffey in Dublin, Ireland
Sherwin Miller Museum of Jewish Art in Tulsa, Oklahoma, was founded in 1966
Sherwin Range, mountain range that is a part of the Sierra Nevada, in California, USA
Sherwin Summit (el. 6,426 feet, 1,959 m), a mountain pass on U.S. Highway 395
Sherwin-Williams, American Fortune 500 company in the general building materials industry

References